Gregory Mervyn Wallace (born 21 September 1950) is a New Zealand former cricketer. He played one first-class and one List A match for Auckland.

See also
 List of Auckland representative cricketers

References

External links
 

1950 births
Living people
New Zealand cricketers
Auckland cricketers
Cricketers from Auckland